Big Break Regional Shoreline is a regional park in Oakley, Contra Costa County, northern California.  It is a part of the East Bay Regional Park District system.

Delta Visitor Center
The park features an $11 million, 5,000-square-foot Delta Visitor Center, which operates as a natural history museum, science laboratory, and staging area for paddling and hiking trips along the Sacramento–San Joaquin River Delta. The new visitor center opened in October 2012. 

The center includes a  interactive map of the Sacramento–San Joaquin River Delta  that shows visitors how water flows through the region. A 30-by-50 model of the delta is also located at the park, as well as restored wetlands.

Park name
The park is named for a break in the levee system that flooded an asparagus farm between the San Joaquin River and Dutch Slough in 1928. The break formed a small bay along the river, near the area where fresh water from the river mixes with salt water from San Francisco Bay.

Wildlife
According to the East Bay Regional Parks District, Big Break Regional Shoreline provides habitat for at least 70 species of birds and several species of mammals. They include: 
 Birds include black rail, northern harrier, white-tailed kite, yellow-breasted chat, great blue heron, great egret, snowy egret, green heron and white-faced ibis.
 Mammals include beavers, muskrats, and river otters. 
 Reptiles include western pond turtles, a California Species of Special Concern.

Activities
The Delta Discovery Experience includes covered outdoor educational areas for explaining the ecosystems and wildlife of the Delta region.
The park offers picnic areas and a small shaded amphitheater.
Fishing is a popular recreational activity. A -long fishing pier extends into the river from the park. Off-shore fishing is also popular. The chief varieties of fish include largemouth bass, striped bass, white catfish, bluegill, sunfish and sturgeon. Fishermen must have a California fishing license.
A beach launch is available for kayaks and canoes. 
Big Break is a terminus for Big Break Regional Trail and Marsh Creek Regional Trail.
The Visitor center offers craft activities and programs every weekend.

Accessibility
The park is open daily from sunrise to sunset. The Visitor Center is open Wednesday-Sunday, 10am to 4pm. The park is at 69 Big Break Road in Oakley. It can be reached by private vehicles from Main Street, and there is no fee for parking or admission. The park is generally wheelchair accessible.

Dogs are permitted, except in marsh and wetland habitats in the park.

See also

References

External links
 East Bay Regional Park District: official Big Break Regional Shoreline website
 Delta Science Center
 East Bay Regional Park District - Big Break Regional Shoreline

East Bay Regional Park District
Parks in Contra Costa County, California
Regional parks in California
Sacramento–San Joaquin River Delta
2012 establishments in California
Protected areas established in 2012